Nikhom Phatthana is a district (amphoe) of Rayong province, eastern Thailand.

History
The minor district (king amphoe) was established on 15 July 1996 by splitting four tambon from Ban Khai district.

On 15 May 2007, all 81 minor districts in Thailand were upgraded to full districts. With publication in the Royal Gazette on 24 August, the upgrade became official.

Geography
Neighboring districts are (from the north clockwise) Pluak Daeng, Ban Khai, Mueang Rayong, and Ban Chang of Rayong Province, and Bang Lamung of Chonburi province.

Administration
The district is divided into four sub-districts (tambons), which are further subdivided into 30 villages (mubans). Map Kha is a township (thesaban tambon) which covers parts of tambons Nikhon Phatthana and Map Kha. Also the town Map Ta Phut, centered in Mueang Rayong District, covers parts of tambon Map Kha as well. There are a further four tambon administrative organizations (TAO) responsible for the non-municipal areas.

References

External links
amphoe.com

Nikhom Phatthana